A narluga (portmanteau of narwhal + beluga) is a hybrid born from mating a female narwhal and a male beluga whale. Narwhals and beluga whales are both high Arctic cetaceans and the only two members of the family Monodontidae.

Discovery 
 
The existence of narlugas had been hypothesized for decades before its discovery. There are 20 known hybrids in the family of cetaceans in existence, with 7 of those occurring only in captivity. In 1990, Mads Peter Heide-Jørgensen
spoke to an Inuk hunter who'd captured an unusual hybrid animal that had both beluga and narwhal anatomy. When Heide-Jørgensen was shown that skull, he determined that it belonged to an unknown Monodontidae, with descriptive properties between a narwhal and a beluga. In particular, the characteristic narwhal 'horn' is anatomically a tooth; the unidentified specimen lacked a single narwhal tusk, but its teeth were spiralled, like the tusk of a narwhal.

The genetic identity of the narluga was confirmed in 2019 when the genome of the specimen was sequenced.

References

External links

Mammal hybrids
Intergeneric hybrids